Julius Müller (10 May 1903 – 1 April 1984) was a German athlete. He competed in the men's pole vault at the 1928 Summer Olympics and the 1936 Summer Olympics.

References

1903 births
1984 deaths
Athletes (track and field) at the 1928 Summer Olympics
Athletes (track and field) at the 1936 Summer Olympics
German male pole vaulters
Olympic athletes of Germany
Place of birth missing